Mohammed Al Turki is a Saudi Arabian film producer.

Filmography

Notes

References

External links
 

Living people
Saudi Arabian film producers
Year of birth missing (living people)